Florent Marais (born 8 July 2000) is a French Paralympic swimmer. In 2021, he won the bronze medal in the men's 100 metre backstroke S10 event at the 2020 Summer Paralympics in Tokyo, Japan.

In 2018, he competed in the men's 100 metre freestyle S10 event at the 2018 Mediterranean Games held in Tarragona, Spain. He also competed at the 2020 World Para Swimming European Open Championships held in Funchal, Portugal.

References

External links
 
 

Living people
2000 births
French male backstroke swimmers
French male freestyle swimmers
Swimmers at the 2018 Mediterranean Games
Swimmers at the 2020 Summer Paralympics
Paralympic bronze medalists for France
Paralympic medalists in swimming
Paralympic swimmers of France
Medalists at the 2020 Summer Paralympics
S10-classified Paralympic swimmers
21st-century French people